Atlantilux puella is a species of sea snail, a marine gastropod mollusk, in the family Costellariidae, the ribbed miters.

References

External links
 Reeve, L. A. (1844-1845). Monograph of the genus Mitra. In: Conchologia Iconica, or, illustrations of the shells of molluscous animals, vol. 2, pl. 1-39 and unpaginated text. L. Reeve & Co., London.
 Sowerby, G. B. II. (1874). Monograph of the genus Mitra. In G. B. Sowerby II (ed.), Thesaurus conchyliorum, or monographs of genera of shells. Vol. 4 (31-32): 1–46, pls 352–379. London, privately published
 Fedosov A.E., Puillandre N., Herrmann M., Dgebuadze P. & Bouchet P. (2017). Phylogeny, systematics, and evolution of the family Costellariidae (Gastropoda: Neogastropoda). Zoological Journal of the Linnean Society. 179(3): 541-626

Costellariidae
Gastropods described in 1845